Musang is a Filipino restaurant in Seattle's Beacon Hill neighborhood, in the U.S. state of Washington.

Description 
The menu has included buttermilk fried chicken, pork lumpia with sawsawan, short rib kare-kare basted with peanut butter bagoong, as well as vegetables in coconut sauce and vegan shrimp paste.

History 
Chef and owner Melissa Miranda opened the restaurant in early 2020.

Reception 
Food & Wine named Miranda one of eleven best new chefs in the United States for her work at the restaurant. In The Infatuation 2022 list of "The 25 Best Restaurants in Seattle", Aimee Rizzo wrote, "Eating at Musang is like being guests at a pal's dreamy dinner party" with "phenomenal takes on Filipino classics" that "make us want to stop everything and sing about them as if life were a movie musical".

See also 

 Filipino-American cuisine

References 

2020 establishments in Washington (state)
Asian restaurants in Seattle
Beacon Hill, Seattle
Filipino-American culture